Purav Raja and Divij Sharan were the defending champions but only Raja chose to defend his title, partnering Fabrice Martin. Raja lost in the quarterfinals to Guillermo Durán and Máximo González.

Bradley Klahn and Peter Polansky won the title after defeating Durán and González 6–3, 3–6, [10–7] in the final.

Seeds

Draw

External Links
 Main Draw

BNP Paribas Primrose Bordeaux - Doubles
2018 Doubles